Maha Dhammaraza Dipati (1714–1754), was the last king of Toungoo dynasty of Burma (Myanmar) from 1733 to 1752. The young king inherited a kingdom already in severe decline, and his inexperience only made the decline faster, finally resulting in the end of House of Toungoo and the collapse of the kingdom over his 18-year reign.

Early life
The future king was born to Prince Taninganway and his chief queen Thiri Maha Mingala Dewi. He was the fifth child and fourth son of the couple. He was given Singu in fief in his youth. He became the heir presumptive because all three elder brothers died young. He was made the heir apparent on 6 May 1727 (1st waning of Kason 1089 ME).

Reign
Five years into his reign, the armies of Manipur invaded and plundered the northern Burmese provinces. The Burmese were unable to suppress them.

Since the move of capital from Pegu to Ava by King Thalun in 1635, Pegu had become the rallying point for the Mon revival and insurgency. The Burmese governors were readily hated due to heavy corrupted taxation. Taking the advantage of weak royal authority after the Manipur invasions, a Burmese governor rebelled and proclaimed himself the King of Pegu in 1740. The Mons, unwilling to have a Burmese king in Pegu, rioted and murdered the new king. Mahadhammaraza Dipati then installed his uncle as the new governor of Pegu.

Yet the Mons were still unsatisfied and went on to kill Burmese officials in Pegu. The king was then enraged at the Mons and ordered a massacre of the Mons at Pegu. The Gwe Shans (the Shans who were taken as captives from their northern homelands to Pegu by King Bayinnaung in the 16th century) took this opportunity to stage their own rebellion. The Shan armies with supports from the Mons took Pegu in 1740. A popular monk of Shan origin was proclaimed Gwe Min the King of Pegu.

As Ava was largely distracted by another Manipur invasion. The Peguan armies invaded Prome and Ava but failed. They were able to take Toungoo. Thado Minkhaung, the viceroy of Prome and Mahadhammaraza Dipati’s brother, hurried south and took Syriam but was soon repelled. Prome eventually fell to the Mons in 1745. The Mons tried to take Ava again without success.

In 1747, Binnya Dala was proclaimed the King of Pegu. The two sides were unable to overcome each other until 1751 when the crown prince of Pegu (Binnya Dala’s brother) marched the Peguan armies into Upper Irrawaddy and laid siege on Sagaing and Ava. Ava fell to the Mons on 22 March 1752 (Wednesday, 8th waxing of Late Tagu 1113 ME) and Maha Dhammaraza Dipati was taken as captive down to Pegu. Mahadhammaraza Dipati had survived for another two years before being executed in 1754 due to a suspected rebellion.

Notes

References

Bibliography
 
 
 

Rulers of Toungoo
1714 births
1754 deaths
18th-century Burmese monarchs